Jatani-ike is an earthfill dam located in Toyama prefecture in Japan. The dam is used for irrigation. The catchment area of the dam is  km2. The dam impounds about 3  ha of land when full and can store 360 thousand cubic meters of water. The construction of the dam was completed in 1949.

References

Dams in Toyama Prefecture
1949 establishments in Japan